The 1927 Copa Aldao was the final match to decide the winner of the Copa Aldao, the 7th edition of the international competition organised by the Argentine and Uruguayan Associations together. The final was contested by Uruguayan side Rampla Juniors and Argentine club San Lorenzo de Almagro.

The match was played at Parque Central Stadium in Montevideo, where San Lorenzo beat Rampla Juniors 1–0, winning its first and only Copa Aldao trophy in the history of the club.

Qualified teams

Match details

References

1928 in Argentine football
1928 in Uruguayan football
A
Football in Montevideo